Raghiveh District is a district (bakhsh) in Haftkel County, Khuzestan Province, Iran. At the 2006 census, its population was 5,352, in 1,048 families.  The district has no cities, and one rural district (dehestan): Gazin Rural District.

References 

Haftkel County
Districts of Khuzestan Province